The Kasturba Health Society was formed on September 11, 1962 to run the Kasturba Hospital

It now runs the Mahatma Gandhi Institute of Medical Sciences and the Kasturba Hospital

References

Hospitals in Maharashtra
Memorials to Kasturba Gandhi
1962 establishments in Maharashtra